Dumber & Dumberest was a comedy programme produced by Square Donkey for British television channel Five.

Channel 5 (British TV channel) original programming
2000s British comedy television series
2003 British television series debuts